This is a list of the works of the Spanish composer Manuel de Falla (1876–1946).

Stage works
See List of works for the stage by Manuel de Falla

Orchestral works
 Noches en los jardines de España ("Nights in the Gardens of Spain") – piano and orchestra (c. 1909–1916)
 Homenajes ("Homages") – orchestra (1938–1939)
 Sections: I. "Fanfare sobre el nombre de E. F. Arbós" – II. "À Claude Debussy (Elegía de la guitarra)" – Rappel de la Fanfare – III. "À Paul Dukas (Spes Vitae)" – IV. "Pedrelliana"

Choral works
 Balada de Mallorca ("Ballad of Majorca") – for choir (1933)

Works for chamber ensembles and solo instruments
 Melodía para violonchelo y piano – for piano and cello (1897)
 Pieza en Do mayor and Romanza – for cello and piano (1898)
 Fanfare pour une fête ("Fanfare for a feast") – for two trumpets, timpani and side-drum (1921)
 Concerto for harpsichord, flute, oboe, clarinet, violin and cello – dedicated to Wanda Landowska (c. 1923–1926)
 Fanfare sobre el nombre de Arbós ("Fanfare on the name of Arbós") – for trumpets, horns and drums (1934); orchestrated as a section of Homenajes.

Vocal works
 Preludios ("Preludes") – voice and piano, text ("Madre todas las noches") by Antonio de Trueba (c. 1900)
 Rima ("Rime") – voice and piano, text ("Olas gigantes") by Gustavo Adolfo Bécquer (c. 1900)
 Dios mío, qué solos se quedan los muertos – voice and piano, text by Gustavo Adolfo Bécquer (c. 1900)
 Tus ojillos negros ("Your small black eyes") – voice and piano, text by Cristóbal de Castro (1902–1903)
 Cantares de Nochebuena "Songs of Christmas Eve" – nine popular songs for voice, guitar and (at least in the case of the first two songs) zambomba and rebec or chicharra (1903–1904)
 Trois mélodies – voice and piano, words by Théophile Gautier (1909–1910)
 Siete canciones populares españolas ("Seven Spanish Folksongs") – for voice and piano, dedicated to Madame Ida Godebska (1914)
 Oración de las madres que tienen sus hijos en sus brazos ("Prayer of the mothers embracing their children" – voice and piano, words by Gregorio Martínez Sierra (1914)
 El pan de Ronda que sabe a verdad ("The bread of Ronda has a taste of truth") – voice and piano, by G. Martínez Sierra (1915)
 Psyché – for mezzo-soprano, flute, harp, violin, viola and cello (1924)
 Soneto a Córdoba ("Sonnet to Cordoba") – for soprano voice and harp (or piano), text by Luis de Góngora (1927)

Instrumental works
Piano
 Nocturne (1896)
 Mazurka in C minor (1899)
 Serenata andaluza ("Andalusian Serenade") (1900)
 Canción ("Song") (1900)
 Vals capricho (1900)
 Cortejo de gnomos ("Procession of Gnomes") (1901)
 Allegro de concierto (1903–1904)
 Cuatro piezas españolas, Pièces espagnoles ("Four Spanish Pieces") – for piano, dedicated to Isaac Albéniz (c. 1906–1909)
 Fantasía Bética – for piano, dedicated to Arthur Rubinstein (1919)
 Canto de los remeros del Volga (del cancionero musical ruso) ("Song of the Volga boatmen") (1922)
 Pour le tombeau de Paul Dukas (1935) – piano (1935); orchestrated as the third part of HomenajesGuitar
 Pour le tombeau de Claude Debussy – for guitar; arranged for piano (1920); orchestrated as the second section of HomenajesVersions and arrangements of other authors' works
Cançó de nadal (1922)
Claude Debussy – Prélude à l'après-midi d'un faune (1924)
Preludio (1924)
Gioachino Rossini – Overture to The Barber of Seville (1924–1925)
Ave María (1932)
L´amfiparnaso (Palma de Mallorca, 1934)
Invocatio ad individuam trinitatem (Granada, 1935)
Himno marcial (Granada, 1937)
Emendemus in melius (Granada, 1939)
Madrigal: prado verde y florido (Granada, 1939)
Romance de Granada: qué es de ti, desconsolado (Granada, 1939)
Tan buen ganadico (Granada, 1939)
¡Ora, sus! (Granada, 1939)
O magnum mysterium (in circuncisione Domini) (Villa del Lago, 1940–1942)
Tenebrae factae sunt (responsorium) (Villa del Lago, 1940–1942)
Miserere mei Deus (salmo 50) (Villa del Lago, 1940–1942)
In festo Sancti Jacobi (o Lux et decus Hispaniae) (Villa del Lago, 1940–1942)
Benedictus (de la misa "Vidi speciosam") (Villa del Lago, 1940–1942)
Gloria (de la misa "Vidi speciosam") (Villa del Lago, 1940–1942)
Cançó de l´estrella (Villa del Lago, 1941–1942)
Romance de Don Joan y Don Ramón (Villa del Lago, 1941–1942)

References

Crichton, Ronald (1992), 'Falla, Manuel de' in The New Grove Dictionary of Opera'', ed. Stanley Sadie (London) 

Falla